Camptocarpus is a genus of flowering plants belonging to the family Apocynaceae.

Its native range is Western Indian Ocean.

Species:

Camptocarpus acuminatus 
Camptocarpus cornutus 
Camptocarpus crassifolius 
Camptocarpus decaryi 
Camptocarpus lanceolatus 
Camptocarpus linearis 
Camptocarpus mauritianus 
Camptocarpus semihastatus 
Camptocarpus sphenophyllus

References

Apocynaceae
Apocynaceae genera
Taxa named by Joseph Decaisne